Antimonides (sometimes called stibnides) are compounds of antimony with more electropositive elements. The antimonide ion is Sb3−. 

Reduction of antimony by alkali metals or by other methods leads to alkali metal antimonides of various types. Known antimonides include isolated Sb3− ions (in Li3Sb, Na3Sb), dumbbells Sb24− in Cs4Sb2, discrete antimony chains, for example, Sb68− in SrSb3, infinite spirals (Sb−)n (in NaSb, RbSb), planar four-membered rings Sb42−, Sb73− cages in Cs3Sb, and net shaped anions Sb32− in BaSb3.

Some antimonides are semiconductors, e.g. those of the boron group such as indium antimonide. Many antimonides are flammable or decomposed by oxygen when heated since the antimonide ion is a reducing agent.

References

See also
 Antimonide mineral

Anions
Antimonides